Trilogia das novas familias is a 2008 documentary film.

Synopsis 
The film consists of three short documentary films that show the faces and give voices to children orphaned by AIDS. The intentions of the documentary are to focus attention on the dismemberment of families in Mozambique due to AIDS, because it is a harsh reality and too often ignored.

References

External links 

2008 films
Mozambican documentary films
2008 documentary films
Documentary films about HIV/AIDS
HIV/AIDS in Africa
Films about orphans